Jeff Cosgriff (born December 26, 1987 in San Francisco, California) is an American soccer player.

Career

Youth and Amateur
Cosgriff grew up in San Bruno, California, attended St. Ignatius College Preparatory School, and played three years of college soccer at Santa Clara University, where he was named to the WCC All-Freshman team in 2006 and earned an All-WCC Honorable Mention in 2008, before transferring to the University of California, Berkeley for his senior year. He appeared in 64 games and scored nine goals during his three years with the Broncos, and played 18 games and scored six goals as a senior for the Golden Bears.

During his college years Cosgriff also played for the San Jose Frogs and the San Francisco Seals in the USL Premier Development League, and for NorCal Lamorinda United in the National Premier Soccer League.

Professional
Cosgriff signed his first professional contract in 2010 when he was signed by AC St. Louis of the USSF Division 2 Professional League. He made his professional debut on April 10, 2010 in St. Louis's first ever game, against Carolina RailHawks.

After the demise of AC St. Louis following the 2010 season, Cosgriff signed with NSC Minnesota Stars of the North American Soccer League on March 22, 2011.

References

External links
 AC St. Louis bio
 Berkeley bio
 Santa Clara bio

1987 births
Living people
American soccer players
Santa Clara Broncos men's soccer players
California Golden Bears men's soccer players
San Jose Frogs players
San Francisco Seals (soccer) players
AC St. Louis players
Minnesota United FC (2010–2016) players
Soccer players from California
USL League Two players
USSF Division 2 Professional League players
North American Soccer League players
Association football midfielders